École publique Hélène-Gravel is a French-medium public school in Greater Sudbury, Ontario, Canada.

This school has an enrolment of 199 girls and boys from preschool to 6th grade. Subjects taught include languages, mathematics, technology, the sciences, the arts, and physical education.

History
The school opened its doors in September 2001. It was named after Hélène Gravel. Gravel served as a teacher at École secondaire Macdonald-Cartier for more than 23 years, where she was instrumental in leading the theatre troupe Les Draveurs. Gravel died on 4 November 2000.

References

Elementary schools in Greater Sudbury
French-language elementary schools in Ontario
Educational institutions established in 2001
2001 establishments in Ontario